The 2014 London Broncos season was the thirty-fifth in the club's history and their nineteenth season in the Super League. Competing in Super League XIX, the club was coached by Tony Rea before being replaced midseason by Joey Grima. They were relegated in 14th place and reached the Fourth Round of the 2014 Challenge Cup.

2014 was their first since moving to the Hive Stadium, but after 19 consecutive seasons in the top flight it was to be their last season in the Super League. They exited the Challenge Cup with a defeat by the Catalans Dragons.

2014 milestones

2014 squad

Super League XIX table

References

External links
Rugby League Project

London Broncos seasons
London Broncos season
2014 in rugby league by club
2014 in English rugby league